Siddavanahalli Nijalingappa (10 December 1902 – 8 August 2000) was an Indian Congress Party politician, lawyer, and Indian independence activist. He was the fourth Chief Minister of Mysore State (now Karnataka), serving two terms (1956–1958 and 1962–1968). In addition to the Indian independence movement, he played an important role in the Karnataka Unification movement.

Early life and education
Nijalingappa was born on 10 December 1902 to a middle-class family in Haluvagalu, a small village in the Bellary district of the Madras Presidency. His father, a small businessman, died when Nijalingappa was five; his mother was a homemaker. His family were Lingayat Hindus; Nijalingappa's mother was a devout worshipper of Shiva. Nijalingappa later recalled that his "father's ancestors were all rich profligates" and that they "dissipated their wealth on gambling, drinking and womanising." He added that his "mother's father helped [his] parents, but [his family] were still very poor."

He grew up in Davanagere and, as a child, was given a traditional education by Veerappa Master, an elder teacher. He joined a formal, western primary school in Davanagere and then a secondary school in Chitradurga in 1919. During this time, he became interested in politics after reading the work of Annie Besant. In 1924, he graduated in the Arts from the Central College Bengaluru, and he got his law degree from the Indian Law Society's Law College in Pune in 1926.

Like many other leaders of the Indian freedom movement, he received a blend of both traditional Indian-style and Western-style education. He was influenced by the ideologies of Mahatma Gandhi and Rajendra Prasad, and began to take an active part in the freedom movement in his native Karnataka.

Political career
Nijalingappa attended Indian National Congress sessions as a spectator. In 1936, when he came into contact with N. S. Hardikar, he took an active interest in the organization. He served first as a volunteer, later becoming president of the Pradesh Congress Committee, and then, in 1968, president of the All India Congress Committee.

He became president of the Mysore Congress and was also a member of the historic Constituent Assembly, from 1946 to 1950. In 1952, he was elected to the First Lok Sabha from the Chitradurga constituency (now Chitradurga), then in Mysore state.

In recognition of his service towards the unification of Karnataka, Nijalingappa was chosen as the first Chief Minister of the unified state. He was re-elected to the same post and continued in that position until April 1968. In Karnataka, he worked on the development of agricultural, irrigation, industrial, and transport projects.

When people expressed their distrust in the party in the 1967 elections, Nijalingappa became Congress President. He chaired two Congress sessions in 1968 and 1969 in Hyderabad and Faridabad, respectively. During this time, the factional feud within the party increased and finally resulted in the historic split of the party in 1969. He was the last president of an undivided Indian National Congress, as the party was then divided into Congress (Organization), which consisted of senior leaders like Nijalingappa, Neelam Sanjiva Reddy, K. Kamaraj, and Morarji Desai; and Congress (R), which supported Indira Gandhi.

After the Congress split, Nijalingappa gradually retired from politics. He later served as chairman of the Sardar Vallabhbhai Patel Society.

Posts held 

 1936–1940: president of Chitaldroog District Congress Committee
 1937–1938: member of the Mysore Legislative Council
 1938–1950: member of the Mysore Congress Working Committee
 1942–1945: general secretary of the Mysore Pradesh Congress Committee (PCC)
 1945–1946: president of the Mysore PCC
 1946: president of the Karnataka PCC
 member of the Constituent Assembly of India and Provisional Parliament
 1948–1950: member and president of the Constituent Assembly of Mysore
 1949: member of the Congress Working Committee
 member of the Gopal Rao Enquiry Committee, Government of Mysore

Death and legacy 
Nijalingappa died on 9 August 2000 at his residence in Chitradurga at the age of 97.

Nijalingappa was widely revered, even after his retirement, and was known for his simplicity and integrity. He is remembered fondly by the Tibetan community of India because as Chief Minister of Karnataka he gave land to Tibetan refugees for the purpose of resettlement. Now, Karnataka has the largest Tibetan settlements and the largest population in exile, with the four Tibetan settlements of Bylakuppe, Mundgod, Kollegal, and Gurupura (near Bylakuppe) in Karnataka.

In 2003, a stamp honouring Nijalingappa was issued. A memorial of Nijalingappa was built beside NH-4 on the outskirts of Chitradurga; it was inaugurated by the Dalai Lama on 29 January 2011. Karnataka chief minister B. S. Yeddyurappa declared that he would name the sugar research institute in Belgaum after Nijalingappa.

References

Further reading

External links

 Biography at Indian National Congress website

1902 births
2000 deaths
India MPs 1952–1957
Chief Ministers of Karnataka
Chief ministers from Indian National Congress
Indian National Congress (Organisation) politicians
Indian National Congress politicians from Karnataka
Kannada people
Lingayatism
Lok Sabha members from Karnataka
Members of the Constituent Assembly of India
Mysore MLAs 1957–1962
Mysore MLAs 1967–1972
Mysore politicians
Members of the Mysore Legislature
People from Chitradurga district
Presidents of the Indian National Congress
Recipients of the Karnataka Ratna